Littoral cell angioma, abbreviated LCA, and formally known as littoral cell angioma of the spleen, is a benign tumour of the spleen that arises from the cells that line the red pulp.

Symptoms
LCAs most often are not clinically detectable. On occasion, their first presentation may be with splenic rupture.

Most patients show no symptoms and the tumours are found incidentally.

Diagnosis
Littoral cell angiomas show in CT scans. They are diagnosed by pathologists by taking a sample of the tumour via Fine Needle Aspiration or Core Needle Aspiration or from a splenectomy.  Histologically, they have anastoming small vascular channels and cystic spaces with papillary projections.

Treatment
The treatment for a littoral cell angioma is a splenectomy.

See also
Vascular tumor

References

External links 

Micrograph of a LCA (webpathology.com).

Benign neoplasms